The Pratt & Whitney T73 (company designation JFTD12) is a turboshaft engine. Based on the JT12A, the T73 powered the Sikorsky CH-54 Tarhe and its civil counterpart Sikorsky S-64 Skycrane flying crane heavy-lift helicopters. Turboshaft versions for naval use are known as the FT12.

Variants
T73-P-1
Basic military model, rated at 4,500 horsepower (3,355 kW) takeoff power and 4,000 horsepower (2,982 kW) maximum continuous power

T73-P-700
Higher-power military model with improved internal components; rated at 4,800 horsepower (3,579 kW) takeoff power and 4,430 horsepower (3,303 kW) maximum continuous power

JFTD12A-3

JFTD12A-4A
Civilian equivalent of T73-P-1

JFTD12A-5A
Civilian equivalent of T73-P-700

FT12Marine powerplant

Applications
 Sikorsky CH-54 Tarhe (T73)
 Sikorsky S-64 Skycrane/Erickson Air-Crane S-64 Skycrane (JTFD12)

Specifications (T73-P-1)

See also

References

 
 Federal Aviation Administration Type Certificate Number E15EA, Revision 8 retrieved 14 February 2014

External links
 Atlantic Canadian Aviation: JT12 for Canadair aircraft

T73
1950s turboshaft engines